St James Park station may refer to:

 St James's Park tube station, a tube station in London, England
 St James Park railway station, a national railway station in Exeter, England